Parsa Assembly constituency is an assembly constituency in Saran district in the Indian state of Bihar.

Overview
As per Delimitation of Parliamentary and Assembly constituencies Order, 2008, No. 121 Parsa Assembly constituency is composed of the following: Dariapur community development block; Shankardih, Anjani, Banouta, Anyay, Baligaw, Marar, Bahar Marar and Parsouna gram panchayats of Parsa CD Block.

Parsa Assembly constituency  is part of No. 20 Saran (Lok Sabha constituency). It was earlier part of Chapra (Lok Sabha constituency).

Members of Legislative Assembly

Election results

2020

References

External links
 

Assembly constituencies of Bihar
Politics of Saran district